The Riksmål Society Literature Prize (Riksmålsforbundets litteraturpris) is awarded annually by the  Riksmålsforbundet for the outstanding publication in riksmål. The prize was awarded until 2002 by the Oslo and Bærum Riksmål League, when it was taken over by the Riksmålsforbundet.

Prize winners
1957 – Terje Stigen  
1958 – Harald Grieg  
1959 – Emil Boyson  
1960 – Odd Eidem  
1961 – Gunnar Bull Gundersen  
1962 – Solveig Christov  
1963 – André Bjerke  
1964 – Odd Hølaas  
1965 – Rolf Jacobsen  
1966 – Karin Bang   
1967 – Hallvard Rieber-Mohn   
1968 – Ebba Haslund   
1969 – Olav Nordrå   
1970 – Finn Carling   
1971 – Per Arneberg   
1972 – Bjørg Vik   
1973 – Aasmund Brynildsen   
1974 – Jens Bjørneboe   
1975 – Stein Mehren   
1976 – Astrid Hjertenæs Andersen   
1977 – Peter R. Holm   
1978 – Knut Faldbakken   
1979 – Åge Rønning   
1980 – Henrik Groth   
1981 – Jan Bull   
1982 – Sissel Lange-Nielsen   
1983 – Odd Abrahamsen   
1984 – Ernst Orvil     
1985 – Harald Sverdrup   
1986 – Carl Fredrik Engelstad   
1987 – Kjell Askildsen   
1988 – Richard Herrmann   
1989 – Gunvor Hofmo   
1990 – Erik Fosnes Hansen   
1991 – Kaj Skagen  
1992 – Paal Brekke  
1993 – Tove Nilsen  
1994 – Tor Åge Bringsværd  
1995 – Fredrik Wandrup  
1996 – Bergljot Hobæk Haff  
1997 – Lars Saabye Christensen  
1998 – Ketil Bjørnstad
1999 – Ingvar Ambjørnsen
2000 – Toril Brekke
2001 – Britt Karin Larsen
2002 – Olav Angell
2003 – Roy Jacobsen
2004 – Anne B. Ragde
2005 – Erland Kiøsterud, for Det første arbeidet (The First Work) 
2006 – Egil Børre Johnsen, for Unorsk og norsk. Knud Knudsen: En beretning om bokmålets far
2007 – Jan Christopher Næss, for Det begynner med sex og ender med døden (It Starts With Sex and Ends With Death) 
2008 – Dag Olav Hessen, for Natur? Hva skal vi med den? (Nature? What Shall We Do With It?)
2009 – Rune Christiansen, for Krysantemum
2010 – Peter Normann Waage, for Leve friheten! Traute Lafrenz og Den hvite rose
2011 – Not awarded
2012 – Terje Holtet Larsen, for Dilettanten
2013 – Ragnar Kvam jr., for Mannen og mytene
2014 – Odd Klippenvåg, for Ada
2015 – Terje Emberland, for Da fascismen kom til Norge.
2016 – Tom Egeland, for Djevelmasken
2017 – Ingvild Burkey, for Et underlig redskap, and Frid Ingulstad
2018 – Simon Stranger, for Leksikon om lys og mørke
2019 – Sverre Mørkhagen, for IBSEN ... den mærkelige Mand
2020 – Karin Fossum, for Bakom synger døden
2021 – Lars Vik, for Bjørg Viks vei

References

Norwegian literary awards